Ambulance LTD is the self-titled debut EP by American indie rock group Ambulance LTD, released in 2003. The EP features the original versions of "Primitive (The Way I Treat You)," "Heavy Lifting," "Young Urban" and "Stay Where You Are," which would be re-recorded for the band's debut album LP.

Track listing
 "Stay Where You Are" – 3:53
 "Primitive (The Way I Treat You)" – 4:04
 "Heavy Lifting" – 3:56
 "Helmsman" – 5:00
 "Young Urban" / "Stay Where You Are" (Outro) (hidden track) – 5:18

Singles
 "Primitive (The Way I Treat You)" (September 22, 2003)

Credits
 All tracks composed by Marcus Congleton.
 Track 1 produced and mixed by Chris Zane at Gigantic Studios.
 Tracks 2 and 5 produced and mixed by Ron A. Shaeffer for Orchard Productions.
 Tracks 3 and 4 produced by Ambulance LTD, Aaron Nevezie, and John Davis at the Abattoir. Mixed by Chris Zane and Marcus Congleton.
 Mastered by Carl Rowatti at Tru Tone Mastering.
 Design by Benjamin Wheelock.
A&R - Leonard B. Johnson

References

2003 debut EPs
TVT Records EPs
Ambulance LTD albums